The New York Lizards, originally the Long Island Lizards, were a Major League Lacrosse (MLL) team based in Hempstead, New York, located on Long Island. They are original members of the MLL. They lost the league's inaugural game on June 7, 2001 to the Baltimore Bayhawks (now Chesapeake Bayhawks), 16–13.

History
In the MLL's inaugural season in 2001, the Long Island Lizards split their home games between Hofstra Stadium, now James M. Shuart Stadium, and EAB Park (now Bethpage Ballpark). For the 2002 season, they used Hofstra Stadium as their home field. As of 2003, the Lizards played all home contests at Mitchel Athletic Complex, in Uniondale, New York until 2008. The team returned to James M. Shuart Stadium for their home games in 2009. The Lizards have won American Division championships in 2001, 2002, and 2003, and Major League Lacrosse titles in 2001, 2003 and 2015. The team made the playoffs in 2005 as a wildcard despite a losing record. The team's name and logo are based on the Italian wall lizard, a small reptile that was imported to Long Island (which has no native lizards) in the 1960s and which populate areas of the team's hometown of Hempstead in Nassau County.
On December 14, 2012, the Lizards changed their name to the New York Lizards.

Prior to the 2015 season, the Lizards made a trade with the Boston Cannons for Paul Rabil. In exchange for Paul Rabil and Mike Stone, the Cannons received Max Seibald, Brian Karalunas and three draft picks. That season, the Lizards won their third Steinfeld Cup and first in 12 years by defeating their instate rival Rochester Rattlers 15–12. The Lizards won the game at Fifth Third Bank Stadium in Atlanta, Georgia before a Steinfeld Cup-record 8,674 fans.

Prior to the 2019 season, Rabil and his brother Michael formed the Premier Lacrosse League, which would compete directly with Major League Lacrosse. With the launch of the PLL, 140 players from Major League Lacrosse migrated to the upstart league. In the Lizards' first season after the pro lacrosse landscape changed vastly, they lost a franchise worst 11 games in 2019, and posted their second-worst winning percentage (.313). After two MLL teams and one went on a hiatus (Charlotte), New York finished last out of six teams that season. After Rob Pannell finished out his contract that season, he too bolted for the PLL. So in 2020, a season shorted and compacted into a week-long, quarantined tournament thanks to the COVID-19 pandemic, the Lizards joined the 2006 Chicago Machine as the only two teams in league history to post a winless season; albeit the 2020 Lizards' 0–5 record was not as bad as the Machine's 0–12 season. Additionally, the Lizards led in all five games and only finished with a -8 goal differential (-11 score differential).

Rivalry

Chesapeake Bayhawks

The Lizards' main rival were the Chesapeake Bayhawks. Between them, they hold 8 of the 15 MLL league championships awarded through the 2015 season. The two teams have played in the championship game five times, with Chesapeake winning 3 of those 5.

Boston Cannons

The Lizards have found a new rival in the Boston Cannons after they traded their All Star Mid Fielder Paul Rabil to New York in January 2015. That season the Lizards faced the Cannons in the MLL semi-finals and the game resulted in a dramatic overtime victory for the Lizards(16-15). The tension of that game continued into the 2016 MLL season when the Cannons came to James M. Shuart Stadium, which resulted in another intense over-time victory for the Lizards(13-12).

General managers
 Joe Spallina was the head coach and general manager of the New York Lizards.

Coaching staff

Current coaching staff
 Head coach – BJ O'Hara
 Assistant coach – Ted Garber
 Assistant coach – Mike Gongas

All-time head coaches

Current roster

(C)- captain

MLL Award winners

Most Valuable Player
 Jay Jalbert: 2003
 Greg Gurenlian: 2015
 Rob Pannell: 2018

 Rookie of the Year
 Matt Gibson: 2012
 Rob Pannell: 2013

Coach of the Year
 John DeTommaso: 2001
 Jim Mule: 2010
 Joe Spallina: 2012

 Offensive Player of the Year
 Rob Pannell: 2016, 2018

 Defensive Player of the Year
 Nicky Polanco: 2005
 Joe Fletcher: 2015

 Goalie of the Year
 Brian Dougherty: 2003
 Drew Adams: 2010, 2011, 2015

Most Improved Player
 Stephen Peyser: 2011

Retired numbers
 2 – Greg Cattrano
 9 – Tim Goettlemann
 10 – Jay Jalbert
 29 – Pat McCabe
 21 – Brodie Thoms

Season-by-season

* August 17 game against Baltimore canceled due to rain
 2001 Long Island Lizards season
 2002 Long Island Lizards season
 2003 Long Island Lizards season
 2004 Long Island Lizards season
 2005 Long Island Lizards season
 2006 Long Island Lizards season
 2007 Long Island Lizards season
 2008 Long Island Lizards season
 2009 Long Island Lizards season
 2010 Long Island Lizards season
 2011 Long Island Lizards season
 2012 Long Island Lizards season
 2013 New York Lizards Season
 2017 New York Lizards season
 2018 New York Lizards season
 2019 New York Lizards season

MLL collegiate draft history

First round selections
 2001: Eric Wedin, Johns Hopkins (4th overall)
 2002: None
 2003: None
 2004: None
 2005: None
 2006: None 
 2007: Matt McMonagle, Cornell (10th overall)
 2008: None 
 2009: Zack Greer, Bryant (3rd overall)
 2010: Peter McKee, Duke (4th overall) 
 2011: Zach Brenneman, Notre Dame (5th overall) 
 2012: Rob Pannell, Cornell (1st overall)
 2013: None 
 2014: Joe Fletcher, Loyola (3rd overall); Luke Duprey, Duke (4th overall) 
 2015: None 
 2016: None 
 2017: None 
 2018: Joel Tinney, Johns Hopkins (5th overall)
 2019: None

References 

 
Lacrosse clubs established in 2001
2001 establishments in New York (state)
2020 disestablishments in New York (state)
Lacrosse teams in New York (state)
Sports teams in New York City